Anne-Antoinette Nicolet (1743-1817), was a French businessperson.

She was the owner and managing director of the travelling theatre Theatre des Grand-Danseurs du Roi (after 1792 Theatre de la Galté) in 1780 and 1807 (except 1795–96).

References

1743 births
1817 deaths
18th-century French businesswomen
18th-century French businesspeople
19th-century French businesswomen
19th-century French businesspeople
18th-century theatre managers
19th-century theatre managers